Presidential elections were held in Sri Lanka on 16 November 2019. The incumbent President Maithripala Sirisena's term of office would have ended on 9 January 2020. This was the first presidential election in Sri Lanka where no sitting president, prime minister or opposition leader ran for president. Gotabaya Rajapaksa won the election in a landslide victory, defeating his main opponent Sajith Premadasa.

The results were announced on 17 November 2019, and Rajapaksa managed to cross the majority mark to win the election. The next presidential elections are scheduled for 2024. Snap indirect elections would be held in 2022 after Rajapaksa's resignation.

Electoral system 
The President of Sri Lanka is elected via limited ranked voting. Voters can express up to three ranked preferences for President. If no candidate receives over 50% of valid votes on the first count, all candidates except for the two candidates receiving the highest number of votes are eliminated. The second and third preferences of the eliminated candidates are distributed until one of the remaining two candidates receives an outright majority. In practice, this system has seen little use, as each direct election going back to the first in 1981 has resulted in a candidate from one of the two major parties or alliances at the time winning in the first count. For this reason, many citizens opt to mark only one candidate, and many are wholly unaware that multiple candidates can be ranked at all.

Timeline
2018
26 October–16 December – 2018 Sri Lankan constitutional crisis: Mahinda Rajapaksa and President Maithripala Sirisena conspire to take the office of Prime Minister before the election.
2019
9 January – President Maithripala Sirisena becomes eligible to call for presidential elections at anytime.
31 January – President Sirisena is approved unanimously as the candidate of the Sri Lanka Freedom Party during the Party's Anuradhapura district convention.
6 March – Gotabaya Rajapaksa submits application through the United States Embassy to renounce his US citizenship.
26 March – Gotabaya Rajapaksa travels to the United States for a personal visit, where he also expects to expedite his request to renounce his citizenship.
7 April – While in the United States, Gotabaya Rajapaksa is served with notice of two separate civil lawsuits against him in California, USA, over the assassination of journalist Lasantha Wickrematunge as well as on behalf of a Tamil torture survivor Roy Samathanam.
12 April – Gotabaya Rajapaksa returns to Sri Lanka from the United States.
21 April – 2019 Sri Lanka Easter bombings
27 April – Gotabaya Rajapaksa announces he will run for president.
11 August – Mahinda Rajapaksa and his party, the Sri Lanka Podujana Peramuna, officially announces Gotabaya Rajapaksa as its presidential candidate.
12 August – Several members of the United National Party organize a rally in Badulla to promote Sajith Premadasa as the UNP candidate, though the party was yet to name an official candidate. Sajith Premadasa clearly showed his intentions to run for the presidency. All UNFGG MPs in Badulla attended the rally, as well as Harsha de Silva, Eran , Ajith, Sujeewa, Ranith, Ranjith Aluwihare, Wasantha Aluwihare, Chandrani, Buddhika, Hesha, Ashok.
18 August – Janatha Vimukthi Peramuna leader Anura Kumara Dissanayaka is announced as the presidential candidate of the newly formed political alliance, the "National People's Power", in a rally held at Galle Face.
23 August – Mangala Samaraweera pledges to support to Sajith as the UNP candidate during a huge rally in Matara.
5 September – During a huge rally in Kurunegala, organized by all Kurunegala UNP MPs except Akila Viraj Kariyawasam, MPs pledge to support to Sajith as the UNP candidate.
5 September – The Sri Lanka Freedom Party informs the Elections Commission that they will be fielding a candidate for the upcoming presidential election.
6 September – Prime Minister and the leader of UNP Ranil Wickremesinghe reportedly expresses his intentions to be the presidential candidate of his party.
15 September – The National Elections Commission now has the power to call for a Presidential Election at any time.
18 September – The department of government printing Sri Lanka prints an extraordinary gazette, which lists 7 October 2019 as the date of nominations and 16 November as the date of election with the consultation of the election commission Sri Lanka.
24 September 2019 – Prime Minister Ranil Wickremesinghe agrees to nominate UNP Deputy Leader minister Sajith Premadasa as the presidential candidate of the United National Front, the decision is yet to be approved by the working committee of the party.
26 September 2019 – United National Party schedule its working committee meets at Sirikotha to select its candidate by party law.
26 September 2019 – The working committee of the UNP unanimously selects Sajith Premadasa as its presidential candidate.
29 September 2019 – Former Chief of the Sri Lankan Army Mahesh Senanayake announces that he will contest for president under the non-political National People's Movement (NPM), a collective of island-wide civil society organisations.
30 September – The Court of Appeal agrees to support the petition against recognizing former Defense Secretary Gotabaya Rajapaksa as a citizen of Sri Lanka on October 2.
1 October – Gotabaya Rajapaksa seeks court permission to travel to Singapore from 9 to 12 October due to a medical issue.
2 October – A three-judge bench of the Court of Appeal commences the petition filed against recognizing former Defence Secretary Gotabaya Rajapaksa as a Sri Lankan citizen.
3 October – United National Party holds its National Convention at the Sudathasada Indoor Stadium to officially name Sajith Premadasa as its candidate to the public.
4 October – Charges against Gotabaya Rajapaksa's citizenship issue are dismissed by the court and Rajapaksa is permitted to contest in the upcoming election.
5 October – The first ever presidential debate between presidential candidates is held. All main candidates except Gotabaya Rajapaksa took part in the event.
7 October – Nominations for the next president are held between 9:00 a.m. to 11:00 a.m. A record of 33 candidates were nominated.
9 October – The SLFP pledges to support SLPP candidate Gotabaya Rajapaksa.
15 October –  The Sri Lanka Muslim Congress pledges its support for UNP candidate Sajith Premadasa
15 October – The Tamil Progressive Front pledges to support UNP candidate Sajith Premadasa.
18 October – The Ceylon Workers' Congress pledges to support SLPP candidate Gotabaya Rajapaksa.
18 October – The Jathika Hela Urumaya holds a national convention to announce its support for UNP candidate Sajith Premadasa.
4 November – The Tamil National Alliance pledges its support for UNP candidate Sajith Premadasa
5 November – Former President of Sri Lanka and SLFP leader Chandrika Kumaratunga pledges to support UNP candidate Sajith Premadasa.
16 November – Election day: Election of the next president is held between 7:00 AM and 5:00 PM.
17 November 2019 – President Maithripala Sirisena's first term of office ends.
18 November 2019 – Gotabaya Rajapaksa is inaugurated as the 8th President of Sri Lanka at Ruwanwelisaya.
20 November 2019 – Prime Minister Ranil Wickremesinghe resigns.  
21 November 2019 – President Gotabaya Rajapaksa appoints his brother Mahinda Rajapaksa as Prime Minister.

Prior to the election

Poll prediction
Both main candidates have had their own surveys carried out with the results claiming victory for each of them. Earlier circulated polls prediction which was claimed done by National Intelligence Service was proved false and manipulated.

Nominations

Sri Lanka Podujana Peramuna
After the massive victory they won in Local Elections, the Sri Lanka Podujana Peramuna intended to run for the presidential election, with Chamal, Basil and Gotabaya all being mentioned as credible prospects. Calls for Gotabaya Rajapaksa to run were made even though he was ineligible to run due to his possession of foreign citizenship. Basil Rajapaksa also held foreign citizenship and was therefore ineligible. On 12 January Gotabaya announced he was ready to run in the elections if he had the support for it, though his announcement stunned senior SLPP leaders.

Chamal Rajapaksa had also signaled his potential candidacy saying he would "willingly consider it if the party nominates him as the next presidential candidate", soon after the announcement made by his brother. Chamal Rajapaksa could not decide whether to contest from the SLFP or the SLPP but preferred a candidate that has the support of both. Gotabaya Rajapaksa was a leading figure in the war victory of Sri Lanka and the development process of the Colombo metro region and the Northern Province.

In March, Chamal denied that neither him nor Basil would contest but avoided commenting about Gotabaya. Meanwhile the SLPP announced that they favoured Gotabaya unless someone better is found.

Gotabaya Rajapaksa already had a well organized campaign promoting him and according to D. B. S Jeyaraj, the Rajapaksa family had chosen to support Gotabaya as the candidate and is renouncing his US citizenship.

Gotabaya Rajapaksa announced he would run for presidency on 11 April, six days after the 2019 Sri Lanka Easter bombings. On 11 August Mahinda Rajapaksa and the SLPP officially announced that his brother Gotabaya would be its presidential candidate, while Mahinda would run as his Prime Ministerial candidate.

United National Party (UNP) 
The United National Party did not field a presidential candidate in either the 2010 and 2015 elections and supported a common candidate in both elections. Even though they won the 2015 election and elected Maithripala Sirisena from their support, UNP expenditure for the election period is 500lkr million relations between the president and the UNP was shaky from the beginning. The power struggle between the president and UNP prime minister Ranil Wickremesinghe led to the 2018 Sri Lankan constitutional crisis. In the aftermath of the events, most of the UNP members publicly expressed their regret supporting a common candidate in 2015 and promised to field their own presidential candidate in the 2019 elections.

Party leader Ranil Wickremesinghe was the obvious choice for the candidacy and he reportedly expressed his intentions to run for the presidency in a meeting with other senior members. Meanwhile, several rebel MPs including Mangala Samaraweera, Harin Fernando, Ajith Perera, Harsha de Silva and Sujeewa Senasinghe wanted deputy leader Sajith Premadasa as the UNP candidate, and organized a rally in Badulla where Premadasa himself openly expressed his intentions to be the UNP candidate

With the growing support for the deputy leader Sajith Premadasa and party leader Ranil Wickremesinghe refusing to make a move, speaker of the parliament Karu Jayasuriya released a statement signaling his intention to run for presidency to end the confusion and avoid a rift within the party However, the Sajith faction showed that they had the popular support among party members and followers by organizing successful rallies in Matara Kurunegala and Matugama.

On 26 September 2019, the working committee of the United National Party unanimously picked Sajith Premadasa as the UNP presidential candidate. Announcing the official statement, general Secretary of the UNP Akila Viraj Kariyawasam told that Ranil Wickremesinghe will continue to function as the Prime Minister and the leader of the UNP.

Sri Lanka Freedom Party (SLFP) 
President and leader of the SLFP Maithripala Sirisena was eligible to run for a second term. Although he had previously stated that he would only serve a single term, after being sworn in in 2015, he had since expressed his desire to stay for a second term. However, with many party seniors choosing to support the newly formed Sri Lanka Podujana Peramuna led by former SLFP leader Mahinda Rajapaksa, the SLFP was weakened and suffered a heavy loss in the 2018 Sri Lankan local elections, thus losing the credibility it had as the main opposition to the UNP.

The SLFP pledged to support SLPP candidate Gotabaya Rajapaksa on 9 October.

National People's Power (NPP)
The National People's Power party announced Janatha Vimukthi Peramuna leader Anura Kumara Dissanayaka as their candidate in a massive rally on 18 August at Galle Face.

Candidates 
35 candidates submitted their nominations on 7 October to the election commission.

Results

By district

Maps

Aftermath

Resignations

Minister Mangala Samaraweera informed President Maithripala Sirisena via a letter that he would step down as Minister of Finance with immediate effect. In the letter, minister Samaraweera stated that the 2019 election was the most peaceful and fair election held in the recent past.

In a tweet, Minister Harin Fernando said, respecting the people's mandate, he will step down as Minister of Sports, Telecommunications and Foreign Employment. He will also be resigning from his positions at the United National Party. “I take this opportunity to thank every one who supported me in my tenure, hope good work done will be continued”, he added.

Non-Cabinet Minister Ajith P. Perera said, respecting the mandate of the people of Sri Lanka, that he has decided to resign from his position as the Minister of Digital Infrastructure and IT with immediate effect. Tagging Sajith Premadasa he added, “It was a well fought battle”, “and the country needs your leadership at this critical time”.

State Minister Ruwan Wijewardene congratulated Gotabaya Rajapaksa via Twitter for his victory in the election and said he will step down as State Minister of Defence. “I hope we will be able to build a nation free of division that unites all communities to take this country forward,” he added.

Minister Kabir Hashim decided after the results were announced to resign as the Chairman of the United National Party and as the Minister of Highways, Road Development and Petroleum Resources Development.

Issuing a statement, Minister Malik Samarawickrama said he will step down as Minister of Development Strategies and International Trade.

Minister of Megapolis and Western Development, Patali Champika Ranawaka, resigned from his ministerial portfolio. In a letter to President Gotabaya Rajapaksa, he stated that he took this decision with respect to the people's mandate.

International reaction
 Supranational bodies
 – A statement was issued noting that Sri Lanka's election process was peaceful and confirmed the stability of the democratic institutions, while adding the EU was looking forward to working with the new President Gotabaya Rajapaksa to continue improving human rights, reconciliation and good governance. While congratulating President Rajapaksa, the EU assured that it will remain fully supportive of the broader reform agenda in Sri Lanka.

 Nations
 – Foreign Ministry spokesperson Geng Shuang expressed congratulations on the election of Gotabaya Rajapaksa.
 – Prime Minister Narendra Modi tweeted after Premadasa had conceded defeat, congratulating Rajapaksa.
 – Ministry of Foreign Affairs of Japan announced that Prime Minister ABE Shinzo sent a congratulatory message and that he intends to further develop the Japan-Sri Lanka relationship to H.E. Mr. Gotabaya Rajapaksa, the new President of the Democratic Socialist Republic of Sri Lanka, upon his victory in the presidential election held on 16 November and his inauguration as the new president.
 – Foreign Ministry spokesman Abbas Mousavi congratulated the Sri Lankan nation and president-elect on holding presidential elections successfully.
 – President Ibrahim Mohamed Solih was the first world leader to congratulate Rajapaksa on his ”resounding election victory".
 – Foreign Affairs Ministry issued a statement stating: "The Government and leadership of Pakistan warmly felicitate the newly-elected President".
 – Prime Minister Lee Hsien Loong issued a statement stating: "I am confident that you will be able to steward Sri Lanka through these challenges ably, and that Sri Lanka will make progress in achieving lasting peace and prosperity under your Presidency."
 – President Vladimir Putin issued a statement stating: "The Russian-Sri Lankan relations are of traditionally friendly nature, I wish you every success, good health and prosperity."
 – The U.S. Embassy in Colombo in a statement said that "We commend the Elections Commission, civil society and government authorities for promoting a peaceful election. We are ready to continue our work with the new President and with all the people of Sri Lanka in supporting the country's sovereignty through heightened good governance, expanded economic growth, the advancement of human rights and reconciliation, and in fostering an Indo-Pacific region where all countries can prosper."

See also

2019 in Sri Lanka

Notes

References

External links
Department of Elections 
Centre for Monitoring Election Violence (CMEV)
Will Presidential Elections affect Tourism in Sri Lanka? 
 

 
Sri Lanka
Presidential election
Gotabaya Rajapaksa
Sri Lanka
Presidential elections in Sri Lanka